Coqueiros do Sul is a municipality in the North-west of the state of Rio Grande do Sul, Brazil. It's part of the subregion of Carazinho and is situated 306 km to the north-west of Porto Alegre, capital of the state. It is situated on a latitude of -28.118889 and a longitude of -52.782778, and an elevation of 601 meters above the sea level.

The municipality has a 98.8% schooling percentage. The child mortality rate is 47.62 deaths per 1,000 live births.

Its population are mostly from German descent (60% in its origin, roughly), but also of Italian and Portuguese descent.

The main economy production of Coqueiros do Sul is agriculture. Soybeans, corn and wheat are the major products.

Photos

See also 
List of municipalities in Rio Grande do Sul

References 

Municipalities in Rio Grande do Sul